{{Infobox motor race
|Race name         = Grand Prix de Ponce
|Track map         = 
|Series long       = American GT Series, Marlboro GT de las Americas
|Series short      = 
|Venue             = Ponce Speedway
|Sponsor           = Ponce Grand Prix, Inc.<ref>[http://lmuponce.dyndns.org/PROYECT/1993-1994/RES_93-94/RES_042_93-94.PDF Resolucion 042 (1993-1994)] Legislative Assembly. Government of the Autonomous Municipality of Ponce. 17 September 1993. Retrieved 8 July 2012.</ref> 
|First race        = 
|Last race         = 
|Distance          = 300 miles (483 km)
|Laps              = 200
|Previous names    = Grand Prix Marlboro,Marlboro GT de las Americas The new speedway opened in 2003.

History
The Grand Prix Marlboro de Ponce first started in 1993. The 60,000 fans attending provided the momentum to continue celebrating the races.

Location
Today's Grand Prix de Ponce takes place in Ponce at El Tuque, a beach, speedway and marina complex just west of Ponce. The new speedway venue is called the Ponce International Speedway Park'' and opened in 2003. It includes a drag-racing track and circuit track.

Winners

GT Marlboro de las Américas 1993
The 1993 winners were:

VIII Championship GT Marlboro de Las Américas, Grand Prix de Ponce, 3 October 1993.

GTS: (46) Adriano Abreu, Oldomobile Cutlass.

GTU: (85) Tony Canahuate, Porsche 911.

GT Marlboro de las Américas 1994
The 1994 winners were:

V Championship GT Marlboro de Las Américas, Ponce Grand Prix. 2 October 2012:

GTS: (35) Armando Mandy-González (Puerto Rico), Chevrolet Camaro.

VI Championship GT Marlboro de Las Américas, Ponce Grand Prix. October 1994.

GTS: (35) Armando Mandy-González / Manolo Villa (Puerto Rico), Chevrolet Camaro.

IX Championship GT Marlboro de Las Américas. 8 December 1994.

GTS: (46) Adriano Abreu, Chevrolet Camaro.

GTU: (19) Peter Moodie (Trinidad & Tobago), Mazda RX-7.

GT Marlboro de Las Américas Champions:

GTS: (98) Wally Castro / Rolando Falgueras (Puerto Rico), Ford Mustang Cobra, with 118 pts.

GTU: (44) Paco Aponte (Puerto Rico), Mazda RX-7, with 128 pts.

GT Marlboro de las Américas 1995
The 1995 winners were:

VI Championship GT Marlboro de Las Américas, Grand Prix de Ponce, October 1995.

GTS: (35) Armando Mandy-González / Manolo Villa (Puerto Rico), Chevrolet Camaro.

References

Recurring sporting events established in 1993
February events
Annual events in Puerto Rico
1993 in Puerto Rican sports
Entertainment events in Puerto Rico
Events in Ponce, Puerto Rico
Sports events in Ponce, Puerto Rico
1993 establishments in Puerto Rico